The following lists events that happened during 1834 in New Zealand.

Incumbents

Regal and viceregal
Head of State – King William IV
Governor of New South Wales – Major-General Sir Richard Bourke

Government and law
British Resident in New Zealand – James Busby

Events 
March
 – James Busby convenes a meeting of Māori chiefs from northern New Zealand. They will become the United Tribes of New Zealand.
9 March or 20 March – The United Tribes of New Zealand choose a design for their flag.
30 December – William Colenso, printer/missionary for the Church Missionary Society, arrives at Paihia in the Bay of Islands.

Undated
The house for James Busby is completed. After the signing of the Treaty of Waitangi there in 1840 it will be known as the Treaty House.
Late in the year a site is chosen for a mission at Matamata by Alfred Nesbitt Brown and William Williams. (see also 1833 & 1835)
The establishment of the Anglican mission at Te Papa peninsula, Tauranga, is begun late in the year.
While in England, Thomas McDonnell is appointed Additional British Resident in New Zealand (or early 1835)
Two Māori converts returning from the Bay of Islands introduce Christianity to Gisborne. (see also 1838)

Births
 14 February (in England): William Odgers R.N., Victoria Cross recipient.
 16 March (in Scotland): James Hector, geologist.
Undated
 Malcolm Fraser, surveyor.
Approximate
 Alfred Henry Burton, photographer.

See also
List of years in New Zealand
Timeline of New Zealand history
History of New Zealand
Military history of New Zealand
Timeline of the New Zealand environment
Timeline of New Zealand's links with Antarctica

References

External links